The count of Champagne was the ruler of the County of Champagne from 950 to 1316. Champagne evolved from the County of Troyes in the late eleventh century and Hugh I was the first to officially use the title count of Champagne.

Count Theobald IV of Champagne inherited the Kingdom of Navarre in 1234. His great-granddaughter Joan married King Philip IV of France. Upon Joan's death in 1305, their son Louis became the last independent count of Champagne, with the title merging into the royal domain upon his accession to the French throne in 1314.

The titular counts of Champagne also inherited the post of seneschal of France.

Counts and dukes of Champagne, Troyes, Meaux and Blois

Dukes of Champagne
In Merovingian and Carolingian times, several dukes of Champagne (or Campania) are known. The duchy appears to have been created by combining the civitates of Rheims, Châlons-sur-Marne, Laon, and Troyes. In the late seventh and early eighth centuries, Champagne was controlled by the Pippinids; first by Drogo, son of Pippin of Herstal, and then by Drogo's son Arnulf.

Drogo (690–707), abdicated
Arnulf (707-723), deposed

Counts of Meaux and Troyes

Counts of Troyes and Meaux
Robert of Troyes (956–967)
Herbert III of Meaux, (967–995)
Stephen I (995–1022)
Odo I of Meaux and III of Troyes (1022–1037), also Count of Blois
Stephen II (1037–1048)
Odo II of Meaux and IV of Troyes (1048–1066)
Theobald I (1066–1089), also Count of Blois

Counts of Champagne

Hugh (1102–1125)
Theobald II (1125–1152)
Henry I (1152–1181)
Henry II (1181–1197), also King of Jerusalem as Henry I
Theobald III (1197–1201)

Theobald IV, also King of Navarre as Theobald I (1201–1253)
Theobald V, also King of Navarre as Theobald II (1253–1270)
Henry III, also King of Navarre as Henry I (1270–1274)
Joan (1274–1305), also Queen of Navarre

Philip (co-ruler of Joan), also King of France as Philip IV
Louis (1305–1316), also King of Navarre, became King of France in 1314, after which the title merged into the royal domain

See also
 Timeline of Troyes

References

Evergates, Theodore. Feudal Society in the Baillage of Troyes under the Counts of Champagne, 1152-1284. 
Evergates, Theodore. Feudal Society in Medieval France: Documents from the County of Champagne.  (paperback),  (hardback)
Evergates, Theodore. "The Aristocracy of Champagne in the Mid-Thirteenth Century: A Quantitative Description." Journal of Interdisciplinary History, Vol. 5. pp 1–18 (1974).

Further reading